2927 Alamosa, provisional designation , is a stony background asteroid from the central region of the asteroid belt, approximately  in diameter. The asteroid was discovered on 5 October 1981, by American astronomer Norman Thomas at Lowell's Anderson Mesa Station in Flagstaff, Arizona. The S-type asteroid has a rotation period of 4.4 hours. It was named after the U.S. town of Alamosa in Colorado.

Orbit and classification 

Alamosa is a non-family asteroid from the main belt's background population. It orbits the Sun in the central asteroid belt at a distance of 2.1–3.0 AU once every 4.03 years (1,471 days; semi-major axis of 2.53 AU). Its orbit has an eccentricity of 0.17 and an inclination of 17° with respect to the ecliptic.

Naming 

This minor planet was named after the U.S. town of Alamosa, Colorado, located in the San Luis Valley on the upper Rio Grande. The town is the birthplace of the discovering astronomer, Norman Thomas. The official naming citation was published by the Minor Planet Center on 20 December 1983. Almosa is Spanish for cottonwood tree.

Physical characteristics 

Alamosa has been characterized as a common S-type asteroid by Pan-STARRS survey, the Small Solar System Objects Spectroscopic Survey (S3OS2), as well as in the SDSS-based taxonomy. In the SMASS-like variant of the S3OS2 taxonomy, Alamosa is a K-type asteroid.

In April and May 2012, a rotational lightcurve was obtained from photometric observations made at the Phillips Academy Observatory . Lightcurve analysis gave a well-defined rotation period of  hours with a brightness variation of 0.26 in magnitude. The Collaborative Asteroid Lightcurve Link assumes a standard albedo for stony asteroids of 0.20 and calculates a diameter of 11.8 kilometers with an absolute magnitude of 12.0.

References

External links 
 Asteroid Lightcurve Database (LCDB), query form (info )
 Dictionary of Minor Planet Names, Google books
 Discovery Circumstances: Numbered Minor Planets (1)-(5000) – Minor Planet Center
 
 

002927
Discoveries by Norman G. Thomas
Named minor planets
19811005